Trevor Bowen (birth unknown – death unknown) was a rugby union and professional rugby league footballer who played in the 1930s and 1940s. He played club level rugby union (RU) for Penygraig RFC, and club level rugby league (RL) for Salford (Heritage No.)

Playing career
Trevor Bowen changed rugby football codes from rugby union to rugby league when he transferred from Penygraig RFC to Salford, he made his début for Salford during August 1934, he transferred from Salford to Dewsbury, he made his début for Dewsbury during November 1937, he transferred from Dewsbury to Castleford on loan during November 1939, he made his début for Castleford on Saturday 25 November 1939, he returned from loan at Castleford to Dewsbury, and he played his last match for Dewsbury during February 1946.

References

External links
Search for "Bowen" at espn.co.uk (RU)
Search for "Bowen" at rugbyleagueproject.org (RL)
Trevor Bowen Memory Box Search at archive.castigersheritage.com
Bowen Memory Box Search at archive.castigersheritage.com
Search for "Trevor Bowen" at britishnewspaperarchive.co.uk

Castleford Tigers players
Dewsbury Rams players
Penygraig RFC players
Place of birth missing
Place of death missing
Rugby league wingers
Salford Red Devils players
Welsh rugby league players
Welsh rugby union players
Year of birth missing
Year of death missing